Mariano Giallorenzo (born 7 August 1982) is an Italian former road cyclist, who competed as a professional from 2005 to 2014. Since 2015, he has worked as a directeur sportif for UCI Continental team .

Major results
2004
 1st Overall Tour du Sénégal
 1st Targa Libero Ferrario
 1st Medaglia d'Oro Nino Ronco

References

External links

1982 births
Living people
Italian male cyclists
People from Rovereto
Sportspeople from Trentino
Cyclists from Trentino-Alto Adige/Südtirol